Kharian may refer to:
 Kharian, Markazi
 Kharian, Semnan